The 2019–20 Florida Gulf Coast Eagles men's basketball team represented Florida Gulf Coast University in the 2019–20 NCAA Division I men's basketball season. The Eagles were led by second-year head coach Michael Fly and played their home games at Alico Arena in Fort Myers, Florida as members of the Atlantic Sun Conference. They finished the season 10–22, 7–9 in ASUN Play to finish in a tie for sixth place. They lost in the quarterfinals of the ASUN tournament to Lipscomb.

Previous season 
The Eagles finished the 2018–19 season 14–18, 9–7 in ASUN play to finish in a tie for third place. In the ASUN tournament, they were defeated by NJIT in the quarterfinals.

Roster

Schedule and results 

|-
!colspan=9 style=| Non-conference regular season

|-
!colspan=9 style=| Atlantic Sun Conference regular season

|-
!colspan=12 style=| Atlantic Sun tournament

Source

References

Florida Gulf Coast Eagles men's basketball seasons
Florida Gulf Coast
Florida Gulf Coast
Florida Gulf Coast